The Governor of Kirov Oblast is the head of government of Kirov Oblast, a federal subject of Russia.

List of officeholders

Timeline

References 

 
Kirov
Politics of Kirov Oblast